Richard M. Isackes is an American theater scholar, currently the Joanne Sharp Crosby Regents Chair in Design and Technology at University of Texas at Austin.

Isackes enjoys a distinguished reputation as a stage designer in regional theatre, opera, and television.  He has twice been the recipient of the Boston Circle Critics award for best scene design for his productions of Translations and Uncle Vanya at the Huntington Theatre. A partial listing of other companies where his work has been produced include: the Opera Theatre of St. Louis, Chicago Lyric Opera, Alabama Shakespeare Festival, Cincinnati Playhouse in the Park, the Hartman Theatre Company, La MaMa Theatre of New York, Boston Lyric Opera, and the Charles Playhouse. Isackes has also designed scenery for CBS, PBS, and NBC. Isackes has served on the faculties of Bucknell University, Boston University and the University of Illinois, where he was a recipient of the prestigious University Scholars Award. Mr. Isackes has been a board member of the National Association of Schools of Theatre and the University Resident Theatre Association; additionally he has been elected to membership in the National Theatre Conference. He currently holds the Joanne Sharp Crosby Chair in Design and Technology at the University of Texas at Austin where he held the administrative position of Chair of the Department of Theatre and Dance for eight years before returning to the faculty in 2006.

He is co-author of The Art of the Hollywood Backdrop.

References

Year of birth missing (living people)
Living people
University of Texas at Austin faculty
American theatre people
Bucknell University faculty
Boston University faculty
University of Illinois faculty